"Too Late to Worry, Too Blue to Cry" is a 1942 song by Al Dexter. It was recorded on March 18, 1942 at the CBS Studio at Radio Station KNX, Sunset Blvd., Hollywood, California with session musicians Frank Marvin, Johnny Bond and Dick Reinhart. It was released on Okeh records #6718 on February 6, 1944, paired with  "So Long Pal". It went to number one on the Folk Juke Box charts for two weeks and stayed on the charts for a total of thirty weeks.

Cover versions
A cover by Glen Campbell reached #76 on the US pop charts in 1962 and was the title song of a Campbell album in 1963.
Esther Phillips reached #121 Billboard in 1969.
A cover by Ronnie Milsap peaked at number six on the Billboard Hot Country Singles chart in 1975.  His version was also a minor pop hit, reaching #101 Billboard and #87 Cash Box.

References
 

1942 songs
1944 singles
Ronnie Milsap songs
Glen Campbell songs
RCA Records singles
Songs written by Al Dexter